Isidor Emmanuilovich Gukovsky (1871–1921) was a Russian revolutionary who was a  People's Commissar of Finance of the RSFSR following the Russian Revolution.

Isidor was the son of a merchant, who became a chemist's assistant. In 1898, he started participating in the Group of Workers Revolutionaries. He a later became a member of the Menshevik faction of the RSDLP. He was imprisoned for inciting the Izhorskiye workers to strike. In 1904 he went to Baku, and used the name Theodor Izmaylovich for his political work. By 1906 he was secretary of the newspaper New Life. He then went to Odessa before travelling abroad. In 1907, he returned to Russia, was arrested, again brought to trial but acquitted (1908). He settled  in Moscow. After the October Revolution he became a Bolshevik and was appointed finance minister, then plenipotentiary representative of Russia in Estonia.  In autumn 1921, he died of pneumonia.

References
Biography

1871 births
1921 deaths
Deaths from pneumonia in the Soviet Union
Bolsheviks
Mensheviks
Russian Jews
Russian Social Democratic Labour Party members
Russian revolutionaries
Ambassadors of the Soviet Union to Estonia